Brian George Kinnear Binnie (born April 1968) is a Scottish male curler.

He is a two-time  and  bronze medallist

Teams

Men's

Mixed

Private life
Married to Alison Binnie and have 3 sons. They co-founded company Denfind Stone Ltd in 2004.

References

External links

Living people
1968 births

Scottish male curlers
European curling champions
Scottish curling champions